Sir Edwin Hartley Cameron Leather  (22 May 1919 – 5 April 2005) was a Canadian-born British Conservative politician. He served as Governor and Commander-in-Chief of the British colony of Bermuda from 1973 to 1977.

Education

Leather was born in Toronto, Ontario, Canada.  He graduated from the Royal Military College of Canada in Kingston, Ontario, in 1937.

He was awarded an Honorary Degree (Doctor of Laws) from the University of Bath in 1976.

Career

During the Second World War, Captain Leather served with the 1st Canadian Parachute Battalion, Canadian Army in England and Europe. He was badly injured in a practice jump when his parachute failed to open. He rejoined his Battalion for D-Day. He served in Europe during World War II with the Toronto Scottish and Royal Canadian Artillery. He wrote a manual for the Home Guard called "Combat without Weapons". He worked as an insurance broker in England and was secretary of the Central London branch of the Association of Supervisory Staff, Executives and Technicians.

At the 1945 general election Leather stood without success in the Bristol South constituency, but at the 1950 general election he was elected as Member of Parliament (MP) for North Somerset. He was a backbencher throughout the period of Conservative governments from 1951–1964. He supported the Unions, and held office in the Association of Supervisory Staffs, Executives and Technicians and supported the miners. Leather never held political office but was a popular speaker at Party Conference and other events, as well as on radio and television. He was a One Nation Tory; he forcefully opposed racism and supported the European Union.

Leather was proposed for a knighthood but, still a Canadian citizen, required the support of the Canadian government which had not made any honour recommendation for some years; Prime Minister John Diefenbaker declined to support the recommendation. He was eventually knighted in 1962 when he was made a Knight Bachelor, having taken British citizenship. He quit Westminster in 1964 because of illness. Poor health and the low pay for MPs forced Leather to retire from Parliament at the 1964 general election and enter business. He returned to the political scene a few years later, as vice-chairman of the National Union of Conservative and Unionist Associations, taking a leading role in fund raising and at Party Conference. In 1973, following the murder of Sir Richard Sharples, Leather was appointed Governor of Bermuda. Despite the assassination of his predecessor and an aide, he lived informally and mixed with locals; he continued to live in Bermuda after his retirement in 1977. He came to the attention of the Commissioner of the Bermuda Police Force after riding his bicycle recklessly. He became the local representative of N M Rothschild & Sons and wrote several thrillers. As Governor, his nickname was "Imperial Leather", a pun on his surname, position and the famous brand of soap.

He was appointed  in 1974 and in 1975 became the first Canadian to be appointed KCVO since the future 1st Lord Shaughnessy in 1907. Leather was an active freemason and an Anglican lay reader. During his time as Governor of Bermuda, Sir Edwin made a significant effort to include a number of influential Bermudians as part of the vice-regal household. Among them were Rev. Thomas N. Nisbett, Bermuda's first Black Church of England priest (later Canon Thomas Nisbett), and Major Clinton Eugene Raynor, promoted to Lieutenant-Colonel and appointed Commanding Officer of the Bermuda Regiment (since 2015 the Royal Bermuda Regiment), the local-service regiment of the British Army organised on territorial lines, from 1980 to 1984 (Lieutenant-Colonel Clinton Eugene Raynor, OBE, ED, JP, was later Honorary Colonel of the Royal Bermuda Regiment).

He was an accomplished gymnast and founded the International Sports Fellowship. Leather was a freemason.

Family

Edwin Leather's parents were Harold and Grace Leather. Leather married Sheila Greenlees in 1940; they had two daughters. Leather's home was Park House, Batheaston. During the First World War Harold Leather served in East Africa with the Army Service Corps, finishing the war as a lieutenant. Upon his return to Canada he established Leather Cartage in Hamilton Ontario. During the Second World War, Harold Leather was made a Member of the Order of the British Empire (1943) for his work in coordinating the Red Cross parcel scheme in Canada. He would go on to become Chairman of the Canadian Red Cross Society. He died in Hamilton, Ontario.

Publications

Sir Edwin Leather monograph, 'Memorandum on a Choice of Countries', 1943.
Sir Edwin Leather 'Human Nature and the Profit Motive', ts. draft for book begun 12 April 1943. The novel features the character, Rupert Conway, of Leather's previous three novels.
Sir Edwin Leather 'Combat without Weapons', handbook, Aldershot: Gale & Polden, 1942 

The Vienna Elephant (Dodd, Mead 1977, Macmillan 1978, Pinnacle p/b 1981)
The Mozart Score (Doubleday 1979, Macmillan 1979)
The Duveen Letter (Doubleday 1980, Macmillan 1980)

References

Books

 Preston, Adrian & Dennis, Peter (eds.) (1976) Swords and Covenants. Totowa: Rowman and Littlefield (#4237)
 Preston, Richard Arthur (1969) To Serve Canada: a History of the Royal Military College of Canada. Toronto: University of Toronto Press (#H16511)
 Preston, Richard Arthur (1982) Canada's RMC: a History of Royal Military College; 2nd ed. (#H16511)
 Preston, Richard Arthur (1968) R.M.C. and Kingston: the effect of imperial and military influences on a Canadian community. Kingston, Ontario (#H16511)
 Smith, R. Guy C. (ed.) (1984) As You Were! Ex-Cadets Remember. 2 vols. Volume I: 1876–1918. Volume II: 1919–1984. Kingston, Ont.: RMC; The R.M.C. Club of Canada (#H1877)

External links

Sir Edwin Leather – Obituaries, News – The Independent

1919 births
2005 deaths
Politicians from Toronto
Royal Military College of Canada alumni
Conservative Party (UK) MPs for English constituencies
Canadian Anglicans
Canadian knights
Canadian Knights Bachelor
Canadian Knights Commander of the Order of St Michael and St George
Canadian Knights Commander of the Royal Victorian Order
UK MPs 1950–1951
UK MPs 1951–1955
UK MPs 1955–1959
UK MPs 1959–1964
Governors of Bermuda
Canadian Army personnel of World War II
Naturalised citizens of the United Kingdom
Canadian emigrants to the United Kingdom
Military personnel from Toronto
Freemasons of the United Grand Lodge of England
N M Rothschild & Sons people
Anglican lay readers
Royal Regiment of Canadian Artillery officers
1st Canadian Parachute Battalion